Vivian Jones (born 1957) is a Jamaican-born British reggae singer, who performed with several bands in the 1970s before recording as a solo artist from 1980.

Biography
Born in Trelawny Parish in 1957, Jones relocated to England at the age of ten to join his parents who had emigrated there a few years earlier. They lived in and around London, moving between Willesden, Alperton, and Harrow, with Jones becoming increasingly involved in the local reggae scene, and in the mid-1970s he began performing with sound systems, initially as a deejay. In the 1970s he was a member of several bands including The Spartans, The Doctor Birds, the Mighty Vibes and the Pieces. In 1980 he began to record as a solo artist, enjoying a hit that year with "Good Morning" (actually a remixed recording by the Mighty Vibes), which topped the UK reggae charts. The following year, he was voted 'Most Talented Singer' in a poll for Black Echoes magazine. He had a series of hits, with his popularity also spreading to Jamaica. Disillusioned with the music industry, he returned to Jamaica in 1982 to stay with his grandparents, and also recorded some material there. He returned to London and began work outside of music. He soon began recording again in his spare time, and his debut album, Bank Robbery, was released in 1984, and he went on to work with Jah Shaka, the two collaborating on the Jah Works album, released in 1987 but recorded a few years earlier. He also recorded in Jamaica for producers such as Bobby Digital and Junior Reid and recorded duets with Sylvia Tella, Debbie Gordon, and Deborahe Glasgow. In the 1990s he set up his own Imperial House label and became known primarily for his lovers rock material, enjoying big hits with "Sugar Love" and "Strong Love", but also recorded more roots-oriented music with albums such as Iyaman (1994). In 1991 he was named 'Best Male Artist' in the British Reggae Industry Awards. He enjoyed an international hit in the late 1990s with "Jah See Dem a Come". In 2007 he released the album 50th, featuring old rhythms from producers such as Bunny Lee, to celebrate his 50th birthday. Lovers Rocking was released in 2013, and Jones recorded material in Jamaica with Sly and Robbie and Bobby Digital for an album planned for release in 2014.

Discography
Bank Robbery (1984), Ruff Cut
Jah Works (1987), Jah Shaka
Collection 1 (1989), Rosie
Jamaica Love (1990), Imperial House
Strong Love (1993), Jet Star
Iyaman (1994), Imperial House
Love Is For Lovers (1995), Imperial House
Big Leaders, Imperial House
Big Leaders Dub, Imperial House
Moment of Magic, Imperial House
The Vivian Jones Songbook Vol.1 (2002), Imperial House
50th (2007), Cousins
One Way Exclusive (2009)
Lovers Rocking (2013)

Compilations
Reggae Max (1997), Jet Star

References

External links
Vivian Jones on Myspace

1957 births
Living people
People from Trelawny Parish
Jamaican reggae singers
20th-century Black British male singers
21st-century Black British male singers